Maximiliano Andrés Díaz (born 15 November 1988) is an Argentine athlete specialising in the triple jump. He represented his country at the 2011 World Championships without qualifying for the final. In addition, he twice won gold at the South American Championships, in 2011 and 2019.

His personal best in the event is 16.51 metres (+1.2 m/s, Buenos Aires 2011). This is the current national record.

Competition record

References

1988 births
Living people
Argentine male long jumpers
Argentine male triple jumpers
Pan American Games competitors for Argentina
Athletes (track and field) at the 2011 Pan American Games
Athletes (track and field) at the 2019 Pan American Games
World Athletics Championships athletes for Argentina
South American Championships in Athletics winners